Platte County was an unorganized county of the Territory of Colorado that existed for two years from 1872 to 1874.  Platte County was created from, and reverted to, Weld County, Colorado.

History
On February 9, 1872, the Colorado General Assembly created Platte County from the eastern portion of Weld County.  Platte County expired on 1874-02-09, after organizers failed to secure voter approval.  The territory of the county reverted to Weld County.

See also

Outline of Colorado
Index of Colorado-related articles
Historic Colorado counties
Weld County, Colorado

References

Former counties of Colorado
Weld County, Colorado